Vincente is a given name. Notable people with the name include:

Vincente Minnelli, American film director and stage director

See also

Vicente (disambiguation), a Spanish and Portuguese name